Wild Instinct (Les Zooriginaux in French) is a 2001 children's television series produced by Procidis about a group of animals living in a zoo. They lead a secret, civilized, sophisticated life when humans do not watch them.

The series premiered in 2001 in France, Belgium, Germany, Italy, and the United Kingdom. 52 episodes were produced.

Episodes
Penguin under pressure
Like father, like son
Who am I?
Croca gets tough
The zoo book
Tiger Minor
Alca's secret
Paparazzi
Diet this
Commando Komo
I love Gnu
Armagibbon
For the love of Lea
When the heat's on
Woki E.T.
All work and no play
Rejuvenation
Attaché-case
Alca's nightmare
A head for figures
Zootomatik
Man eater
Once a star, always a star
Artie alley cat
Money, money
Man's best friend	
Rumour is rife
That's no elephant, that's my wife
Astro-Glodys
Rats-ketters
The curse of the weird wolf
The haunted cage
One animal too many
Chaet never prospers
Chaotic park
Unreluctant zero
The invisible ape
Dropped from the sky
Lord Joe
Head in the clouds
The fleas war
Saint-Valentine's Day
No tea for Tigris
The skunk who stunk
Babe new world
The great zoo race
Best of enemies
Mad toad's day
knocked senseless
Miss Connoch's horoscope
Keeper's Christmas
The sleigh

References

External links
Procidis

2000s French animated television series
2001 French television series debuts
French children's animated television series
Animated television series about mammals